Immune thrombocytopenic purpura (ITP), also known as idiopathic thrombocytopenic purpura or immune thrombocytopenia, is a type of thrombocytopenic purpura defined as an isolated low platelet count with a normal bone marrow in the absence of other causes of low platelets. It causes a characteristic red or purple bruise-like rash and an increased tendency to bleed. Two distinct clinical syndromes manifest as an acute condition in children and a chronic condition in adults. The acute form often follows an infection and spontaneously resolves within two months. Chronic immune thrombocytopenia persists longer than six months with a specific cause being unknown.

ITP is an autoimmune disease with antibodies detectable against several platelet surface structures.

ITP is diagnosed by identifying a low platelet count on a complete blood count (a common blood test). However, since the diagnosis depends on the exclusion of other causes of a low platelet count, additional investigations (such as a bone marrow biopsy) may be necessary in some cases.

In mild cases, only careful observation may be required but very low counts or significant bleeding may prompt treatment with corticosteroids, intravenous immunoglobulin, anti-D immunoglobulin, or immunosuppressive medications. Refractory ITP (not responsive to conventional treatment or constant relapsing after splenectomy) requires treatment to reduce the risk of clinically significant bleeding. Platelet transfusions may be used in severe cases with very low platelet counts in people who are bleeding. Sometimes the body may compensate by making abnormally large platelets.

Signs and symptoms
Signs include the spontaneous formation of bruises (purpura) and petechiae (tiny bruises), especially on the extremities, bleeding from the nostrils and/or gums, and menorrhagia (excessive menstrual bleeding), any of which may occur if the platelet count is below 20,000 per μl. A very low count (<10,000 per μl) may result in the spontaneous formation of hematomas (blood masses) in the mouth or on other mucous membranes. Bleeding time from minor lacerations or abrasions is usually prolonged.

Serious and possibly fatal complications due to extremely low counts (<5,000 per μl) include subarachnoid or intracerebral hemorrhage (bleeding inside the skull or brain), lower gastrointestinal bleeding or other internal bleeding. An ITP patient with an extremely low count is vulnerable to internal bleeding caused by blunt abdominal trauma, as might be experienced in a motor vehicle crash. These complications are not likely when the platelet count is above 20,000 per μl.

Pathogenesis
In approximately 60 percent of cases, antibodies against platelets can be detected. Most often these antibodies are against platelet membrane glycoproteins IIb-IIIa or Ib-IX, and are of the immunoglobulin G (IgG) type. The Harrington–Hollingsworth experiment established the immune pathogenesis of ITP.

The coating of platelets with IgG renders them susceptible to opsonization and phagocytosis by splenic macrophages, as well by Kupffer cells in the liver. The IgG autoantibodies are also thought to damage megakaryocytes, the precursor cells to platelets, although this is believed to contribute only slightly to the decrease in platelet numbers. Recent research now indicates that impaired production of the glycoprotein hormone, thrombopoietin, which is the stimulant for platelet production, may be a contributing factor to the reduction in circulating platelets. This observation has led to the development of a class of ITP-targeted medications referred to as thrombopoietin receptor agonists.

The stimulus for auto-antibody production in ITP is probably abnormal T cell activity. Preliminary findings suggest that these T cells can be influenced by medications that target B cells, such as rituximab.

Diagnosis

The diagnosis of ITP is a process of exclusion. First, it has to be determined that there are no blood abnormalities other than a low platelet count, and no physical signs other than bleeding. Then, secondary causes (5–10 percent of suspected ITP cases) should be excluded. Such secondary causes include leukemia, medications (e.g., quinine, heparin), lupus erythematosus, cirrhosis, HIV, hepatitis C, congenital causes, antiphospholipid syndrome, von Willebrand factor deficiency, onyalai and others. All patients with presumed ITP should be tested for HIV and hepatitis C virus, as platelet counts may be corrected by treating the underlying disease. In approximately 2.7 to 5 percent of cases, autoimmune hemolytic anemia and ITP coexist, a condition referred to as Evans syndrome.

Despite the destruction of platelets by splenic macrophages, the spleen is normally not enlarged. In fact, an enlarged spleen should lead to a search for other possible causes for the thrombocytopenia. Bleeding time is usually prolonged in ITP patients. However, the use of bleeding time in diagnosis is discouraged by the American Society of Hematology practice guidelines and a normal bleeding time does not exclude a platelet disorder.

Bone marrow examination may be performed on patients over the age of 60 and those who do not respond to treatment, or when the diagnosis is in doubt. On examination of the marrow, an increase in the production of megakaryocytes may be observed  and may help in establishing a diagnosis of ITP. An analysis for anti-platelet antibodies is a matter of clinician's preference, as there is disagreement on whether the 80 percent specificity of this test is sufficient to be clinically useful.

Treatment
With rare exceptions, there is usually no need to treat based on platelet counts. Many older recommendations suggested a certain platelet count threshold (usually somewhere below 20.0/µl) as an indication for hospitalization or treatment. Current guidelines recommend treatment only in cases of significant bleeding.
Treatment recommendations sometimes differ for adult and pediatric ITP.

Steroids
Initial treatment usually consists of the administration of corticosteroids, a group of medications that suppress the immune system. The dose and mode of administration is determined by platelet count and whether there is active bleeding: in urgent situations, infusions of dexamethasone or methylprednisolone may be used, while oral prednisone or prednisolone may suffice in less severe cases. Once the platelet count has improved, the dose of steroid is gradually reduced while the possibility of relapse is monitored. 60–90 percent will experience a relapse during dose reduction or cessation. Long-term steroids are avoided if possible because of potential side-effects that include osteoporosis, diabetes and cataracts.

Anti-D
Another option, suitable for Rh-positive patients with functional spleens is intravenous administration of Rho(D) immune globulin [Human; Anti-D]. The mechanism of action of anti-D is not fully understood. However, following administration, anti-D-coated red blood cell complexes saturate Fcγ receptor sites on macrophages, resulting in preferential destruction of red blood cells (RBCs), therefore sparing antibody-coated platelets. There are two anti-D products indicated for use in patients with ITP: WinRho SDF and Rhophylac. The most common adverse reactions are headache (15%), nausea/vomiting (12%) chills (<2%) and fever (1%).

Steroid-sparing agents
There is increasing use of immunosuppressants such as mycophenolate mofetil and azathioprine because of their effectiveness. In chronic refractory cases, where immune pathogenesis has been confirmed, the off-label use of the vinca alkaloid and chemotherapy agent vincristine may be attempted. However, vincristine has significant side effects and its use in treating ITP must be approached with caution, especially in children.

Intravenous immunoglobulin
Intravenous immunoglobulin (IVIg) may be infused in some cases in order to decrease the rate at which macrophages consume antibody-tagged platelets. However, while sometimes effective, it is costly and produces improvement that generally lasts less than a month. Nevertheless, in the case of an ITP patient already scheduled for surgery who has a dangerously low platelet count and has experienced a poor response to other treatments, IVIg can rapidly increase platelet counts, and can also help reduce the risk of major bleeding by transiently increasing platelet counts.

Thrombopoietin receptor agonists

Thrombopoietin receptor agonists are pharmaceutical agents that stimulate platelet production in the bone marrow.  In this, they differ from the previously discussed agents that act by attempting to curtail platelet destruction. Two such products are currently available:
 Romiplostim (trade name Nplate) is a thrombopoiesis stimulating Fc-peptide fusion protein (peptibody) that is administered by subcutaneous injection. Designated an orphan drug in 2003 under United States law, clinical trials demonstrated romiplostim to be effective in treating chronic ITP, especially in relapsed post-splenectomy patients. Romiplostim was approved by the United States Food and Drug Administration (FDA) for long-term treatment of adult chronic ITP on August 22, 2008.
 Eltrombopag (trade name Promacta in the US, Revolade in the EU) is an orally-administered agent with an effect similar to that of romiplostim. It too has been demonstrated to increase platelet counts and decrease bleeding in a dose-dependent manner. Developed by GlaxoSmithKline and also designated an orphan drug by the FDA, Promacta was approved by the FDA on November 20, 2008.

Thrombopoietin receptor agonists exhibited the greatest success so far in treating patients with refractory ITP.

Side effects of thrombopoietin receptor agonists include headache, joint or muscle pain, dizziness, nausea or vomiting, and an increased risk of blood clots.

Surgery
Splenectomy (removal of the spleen) may be considered in patients who are either unresponsive to steroid treatment, have frequent relapses, or cannot be tapered off steroids after a few months. Platelets which have been bound by antibodies are taken up by macrophages in the spleen (which have Fc receptors), and so removal of the spleen reduces platelet destruction. The procedure is potentially risky in ITP cases due to the increased possibility of significant bleeding during surgery. Durable remission following splenectomy is achieved in 60 - 80 percent of ITP cases. Even though there is a consensus regarding the short-term efficacy of splenectomy, findings on its long-term efficacy and side-effects are controversial. After splenectomy, 11.6 - 75 percent of ITP cases relapsed, and 8.7 - 40 percent of ITP cases had no response to splenectomy. The use of splenectomy to treat ITP has diminished since the development of steroid therapy and other pharmaceutical remedies.

Platelet transfusion
Platelet transfusion alone is normally not recommended except in an emergency and is usually unsuccessful in producing a long-term platelet count increase. This is because the underlying autoimmune mechanism that is destroying the patient's platelets will also destroy donor platelets, and so platelet transfusions are not considered a long-term treatment option.

H. pylori eradication
In adults, particularly those living in areas with a high prevalence of Helicobacter pylori (which normally inhabits the stomach wall and has been associated with peptic ulcers), identification and treatment of this infection has been shown to improve platelet counts in a third of patients. In a fifth, the platelet count normalized completely; this response rate is similar to that found in treatment with rituximab, which is more expensive and less safe. In children, this approach is not supported by evidence, except in high prevalence areas. Urea breath testing and stool antigen testing perform better than serology-based tests; moreover, serology may be false-positive after treatment with IVIG.

Other agents
 Dapsone (also called diphenylsulfone, DDS, or avlosulfon) is an anti-infective sulfone medication. Dapsone may also be helpful in treating lupus, rheumatoid arthritis, and as a second-line treatment for ITP. The mechanism by which dapsone assists in ITP is unclear but an increased platelet count is seen in 40–60 percent of recipients.
 The off-label use of rituximab, a chimeric monoclonal antibody against the B cell surface antigen CD20, may sometimes be an effective alternative to splenectomy. However, significant side-effects can occur, and randomized controlled trials are inconclusive.

Prognosis
In general patients with acute ITP will only rarely have life-threatening bleeding. most of the patients ultimately have stable but lower platelet counts which is hemostatic for a person. Unlike in pediatric patients who can be cured; most of the adults will run a chronic course even after splenectomy.

Epidemiology 
A normal platelet count is considered to be in the range of 150,000–450,000 per microlitre (μl) of blood for most healthy individuals. Hence one may be considered thrombocytopenic below that range, although the threshold for a diagnosis of ITP is not tied to any specific number.

The incidence of ITP is estimated at 50–100 new cases per million per year, with children accounting for half of that number. At least 70 percent of childhood cases will end up in remission within six months, even without treatment. Moreover, a third of the remaining chronic cases will usually remit during follow-up observation, and another third will end up with only mild thrombocytopenia (defined as a platelet count above 50,000). A number of immune related genes and polymorphisms have been identified as influencing predisposition to ITP, with FCGR3a-V158 allele and KIRDS2/DL2 increasing susceptibility and KIR2DS5 shown to be protective.

ITP is usually chronic in adults and the probability of durable remission is 20–40 percent. The male to female ratio in the adult group varies from 1:1.2 to 1.7 in most age ranges (childhood cases are roughly equal for both sexes) and the median age of adults at the diagnosis is 56–60. The ratio between male and female adult cases tends to widen with age. In the United States, the adult chronic population is thought to be approximately 60,000—with women outnumbering men approximately 2 to 1, which has resulted in ITP being designated an orphan disease.

The mortality rate due to chronic ITP varies but tends to be higher relative to the general population for any age range. In a study conducted in Great Britain, it was noted that ITP causes an approximately 60 percent higher rate of mortality compared to sex- and age-matched subjects without ITP. This increased risk of death with ITP is largely concentrated in the middle-aged and elderly. Ninety-six percent of reported ITP-related deaths were individuals 45 years or older. No significant difference was noted in the rate of survival between males and females.

Pregnancy 
Anti-platelet autoantibodies in a pregnant woman with ITP will attack the patient's own platelets and will also cross the placenta and react against fetal platelets.  Therefore, ITP is a significant cause of fetal and neonatal immune thrombocytopenia.  Approximately 10% of newborns affected by ITP will have platelet counts <50,000/uL and 1% to 2% will have a risk of intracerebral hemorrhage comparable to infants with neonatal alloimmune thrombocytopenia (NAIT).

No lab test can reliably predict if neonatal thrombocytopenia will occur.  The risk of neonatal thrombocytopenia is increased with:
 Mothers with a history of splenectomy for ITP
 Mothers who had a previous infant affected with ITP
 Gestational (maternal) platelet count less than 100,000/uL

It is recommended that pregnant women with thrombocytopenia or a previous diagnosis of ITP should be tested for serum antiplatelet antibodies.  A woman with symptomatic thrombocytopenia and an identifiable antiplatelet antibody should be started on therapy for their ITP which may include steroids or IVIG.  Fetal blood analysis to determine the platelet count is not generally performed as ITP-induced thrombocytopenia in the fetus is generally less severe than NAIT. Platelet transfusions may be performed in newborns, depending on the degree of thrombocytopenia. It is recommended that neonates be followed with serial platelet counts for the first few days after birth.

History
After initial reports by the Portuguese physician Amato Lusitano in 1556 and Lazarus de la Rivière (physician to the King of France) in 1658, it was the German physician and poet Paul Gottlieb Werlhof who in 1735 wrote the most complete initial report of the purpura of ITP. Platelets were unknown at the time. The name "Werlhof's disease" was used more widely before the current descriptive name became more popular. Platelets were described in the early 19th century, and in the 1880s several investigators linked the purpura with abnormalities in the platelet count. The first report of a successful therapy for ITP was in 1916, when a young Polish medical student, Paul Kaznelson, described a female patient's response to a splenectomy. Splenectomy remained a first-line remedy until the introduction of steroid therapy in the 1950s.

References

External links 

Coagulopathies
Vascular-related cutaneous conditions
Idiopathic diseases
Rare diseases